Kosmos 573 ( meaning Cosmos 573) was an unmanned test of the Soyuz without solar arrays in 1973. It did not dock with a space station.

Mission parameters 
 Spacecraft: Soyuz-7K-T
 Mass: 
 Crew: None
 Launched: June 15, 1973
 Landed: June 17, 1973

External links 

 Mir Hardware Heritage
 Mir Hardware Heritage - NASA report (PDF format)
 Mir Hardware Heritage (wikisource)

References 

Kosmos 0573
1973 in the Soviet Union
Spacecraft launched in 1973